L'amore non ha fine (Love Has No End) is the posthumous album from Italian singer Valentina Giovagnini, containing previously unreleased material. It was released on 15 May 2009.

Track list
L'amore non ha fine
L'altra metà della luna
L'attesa infinita
Continuamente
Voglio quello che sento
Non piango più
Bellissima idea
La mia natura
Non dimenticare mai
Nei silenzi miei
Sonnambula
Ogni viaggio che ho aspettato
Hallelujah (ghost-track)
Somewhere over the rainbow (ghost-track)

Singles
 "L'amore non ha fine" (2009, Promo - Radio)

2009 albums
Valentina Giovagnini albums
Albums published posthumously